Rociverine is an antimuscarinic drug.

References

Tertiary alcohols
Amines
Carboxylate esters
Muscarinic antagonists
Cyclohexanes